Fitz-James is a commune in the Oise department in northern France. The town is named after James FitzJames, 1st Duke of Berwick.

See also
 Communes of the Oise department

References

Communes of Oise